Michael Keith Kettle (born 18 March 1944) is a former English cricketer who played first-class cricket for Northamptonshire from 1963 to 1970. 

Born in Stamford, Lincolnshire, Kettle appeared in 88 first-class matches as a left-arm medium-pace bowler and useful tail-end batsman. He scored 1,117 runs with a highest score of 88 and took 179 wickets with a best performance of 6 for 67 against Sussex in 1968. He took 2 for 30 and 5 for 58 when Northamptonshire beat the touring West Indians in 1966.

References

External links
 

1944 births
Living people
People from Stamford, Lincolnshire
English cricketers
Northamptonshire cricketers
Rhodesia cricketers